Leandro N. Alem  is a terminal station of the Line B of the Buenos Aires Underground. The station's name honours Leandro N. Alem, a UCR politician from the late 19th century.

Overview
It is located at the intersection of Corrientes and Leandro Alem, near the, Luna Park stadium and the Puerto Madero district, and is a short walk from Plaza de Mayo. This station is at sea level, at the bottom of a steep incline; hence the name el bajo (the lowlands), which is historically linked to the bars and night clubs that used to be in the area. Since the 1950s, the zone is used mostly for office buildings. In the future it will connect with the Line E Correo Central station now under construction.

The station was opened in December 1931 as the eastern terminus of the extension of the line from Carlos Pellegrini.

Nearby
 Plaza de Mayo
 Estadio Luna Park
 Puerto Madero
 Buenos Aires Central Post Office
 Leandro Alem Avenue

References

External links

 Subterráneos de Buenos Aires (Official Page) Leandro N. Alem Underground Station

Buenos Aires Underground stations
Railway stations opened in 1931
1931 establishments in Argentina